Telangana Day commonly known as Telangana Formation Day is a state public holiday  in the Indian state of Telangana, commemorating the formation of the state of Telangana. It is observed annually on 2 June since 2014.  Telangana Day is commonly associated with parades and political speeches and ceremonies, in addition to various other public and private events celebrating the history and traditions of Telangana. The state celebrates the occasion with formal events across the districts.  The formal event of national flag hoisting by the Chief Minister of Telangana and the ceremonial parade is held at the parade grounds. Celebrations are held in all the 33 districts of the state.

History
The state of Telangana was officially formed on 2 June 2014. Kalvakuntla Chandrashekar Rao was elected as the first chief minister of Telangana, following elections in which the Telangana Rashtra Samithi party secured a majority.

On 1 July 2013, the Congress Working Committee unanimously passed a resolution to recommend the formation of a separate Telangana state. After various stages the bill was placed in the Parliament of India in February 2014. In February 2014, Andhra Pradesh Reorganisation Act, 2014 bill was passed by the Parliament of India for the formation of Telangana state comprising ten districts from north-western Andhra Pradesh. The bill received the assent of the President and published in the gazette on 1 March 2014.

Significance
The day marks significance in the state's history for the sustained Telangana movement through the years.

Cultural events
The state sponsors events and celebrations spanning four days. Telangana State Awards for exemplary contribution in different fields are presented at different events. Telangana food festival at hotels, cultural events are held at Ravindra Bharathi auditorium. Batukamma festival or Flower/floral festival is celebrated in October or September.

References

Telangana
June observances
Indian state foundation days